Arrington Jones III (born February 16, 1959) is a former American football running back who played one season with the San Francisco 49ers of the National Football League (NFL). He was drafted by the San Francisco 49ers in the fifth round of the 1981 NFL Draft. He played college football at Winston-Salem State University and attended John Marshall High School in Richmond, Virginia. Jones was also a member of the Washington Federals of the United States Football League (USFL). He was a member of the San Francisco 49ers team that won Super Bowl XVI and has been a coach on several collegiate teams.

College career
Jones played for the Winston-Salem State Rams of Winston-Salem State University from 1978 to 1981.

Professional career
Jones was selected by the San Francisco 49ers of the NFL with the 122nd pick in the 1981 NFL Draft. He played in one game for the 49ers during the 1981 season.  He fumbled two kickoff returns of the opening game of the 1981 season at Detroit, site of the Super Bowl that season. He was released after that game and never played another NFL game. The 49ers won Super Bowl XVI against the Cincinnati Bengals on January 24, 1982.

Jones was a member of the USFL's Washington Federals during the 1983 off-season. He was released by the Federals on February 22, 1983.

Coaching career
Jones served as special teams coordinator for the Virginia State Trojans of Virginia State University from to 1986 to 1990. He was also assistant head coach and offensive coordinator from 1990 to 2000. The Trojans won the CIAA Championship in 1995.

He was offensive coordinator and recruiting coordinator for the Winston-Salem State Rams from 2001 to 2003. The Rams appeared in the CIAA Championship Game in 2001.

Jones served as head coach and offensive coordinator for the Virginia Union Panthers of Virginia Union University from 2004 to 2007, accruing a 21–21 record. He led the Panthers to a 9–1 regular season record in 2007, winning the CIAA Eastern Division Championship. The Panthers also earned a berth in the 2007 Pioneer Bowl, losing to the Tuskegee Golden Tigers. He was named the 2007 CIAA Coach of the Year. Jones resigned in March 2008, citing personal reasons.

Jones was the offensive coordinator and quarterbacks coach of the Delaware State Hornets of Delaware State University from 2011 to 2014.

Head coaching record

References

External links
 Just Sports Stats

1959 births
Living people
American football running backs
Delaware State Hornets football coaches
San Francisco 49ers players
Virginia Union Panthers football coaches
Virginia State Trojans football coaches
Winston-Salem State Rams football coaches
Winston-Salem State Rams football players
Sportspeople from Richmond, Virginia
Coaches of American football from Virginia
Players of American football from Richmond, Virginia
African-American coaches of American football
African-American players of American football
21st-century African-American people
20th-century African-American sportspeople